Important Records is an American independent record label based in Groveland, Massachusetts. The idea behind the label is to be like a good record store, with releases from diverse artists and genres.

History
John Brien started Important Records in 2001 out of his Newbury, Massachusetts apartment, initially as an online store. Brien had been the assistant manager of a record shop in Portsmouth, New Hampshire, but he quit when the manager of the store was fired. Important's first two releases were Impossible Love by the American songwriter Daniel Johnston and Amlux by the Japanese noise musician Merzbow. In 2003, Important released A Is for Accident, the debut album of The Dresden Dolls.

Important also operates two sublabels: Cassauna, started in 2011, which releases cassettes in letterpress packaging; and Saltern, started in September 2014, curated by Tashi Wada.

Partial roster of artists

See also
Important Records discography

References

External links
 

Record labels established in 2001
American independent record labels
Experimental music record labels
Companies based in Essex County, Massachusetts
2001 establishments in Massachusetts
American companies established in 2001
Groveland, Massachusetts